Enrico Beruschi (born 5 September 1941) is an Italian comedian, actor, singer and television personality. He studied at the Italian Liceo classico in Milan, having Cochi Ponzoni as his deskmate.

Formerly employed in a food company, Beruschi began his career as a comedian at the Derby Club (Milan) in 1972 . He became popular in 1977 with the RAI variety show Non Stop, in which he proposed the comedy sketches of a bumbling accountant oppressed by his wife (played by Margherita Fumero). In the following years Beruschi appeared in a large number of TV shows, reaching the peak of his popularity with Drive in. From the early 1990s he focused on theatre and standup comedy.

Beruschi also recorded several comedy songs. In 1979 he entered the competition at the Sanremo Music Festival, finishing fifth with the song "Sarà un fiore".

References

External links 

 
 
 

1941 births
Living people
Singers from Milan
Italian television personalities
Italian male film actors
Italian male television actors
Italian pop singers
Italian male singers
Italian comedians
Italian male stage actors
20th-century Italian male actors
Male actors from Milan